Broad Channel is a neighborhood in the New York City borough of Queens.

Broad Channel may also refer to:
 Broad Channel station, a subway station
 "Broad Channel" (Law & Order: Criminal Intent episode)